Micromyrtus acuta is a plant species of the family Myrtaceae endemic to Western Australia.

It is found among rocky outcrops in where the Wheatbelt meets the Goldfields-Esperance region of Western Australia between Yalgoo and Perenjori where it grows in silty to sandy soils around granite and laterite.

References

acuta
Endemic flora of Western Australia
Myrtales of Australia
Rosids of Western Australia
Vulnerable flora of Australia
Plants described in 2006
Taxa named by Barbara Lynette Rye